A speleoseismite is a damaged speleothem (cave deposit) argued to have been deformed by a seismic event (an earthquake). Speleoseismites can include severed stalagmites (those growing from the floor), fallen stalactites (those growing from the ceiling of caves), collapsed cave ceilings, tilted speleothems, change in growth axis of speleothems, stalactite-stalagmite pair displaced from one another and others. These seismites can be used in paleoseismological studies of ancient earthquakes.

References
 Kagan, E.J., Agnon, A., Bar-Matthews, M., Ayalon, A., 2005, Dating large, infrequent earthquakes by damaged cave deposits. Geology, v. 33; no. 4; p. 261-264.
 Gilli, E., Levret, A., Sollogoub, P., and Delange, P., 1999, Research on the February 18, 1996 earthquake in the caves of Saint-Paul-de-Fenouillet area, (eastern Pyrenees, France): Geodinamica Acta, v. 12, p. 143.

Speleothems